Brasschaat Airfield is an airfield located  north of Brasschaat, Antwerp, Belgium. Formerly the base of the Belgian Army Flying Service, it is today home to recreational flying, including gliders and microlights.

See also
List of airports in Belgium

References

External links 
 Airport record for Military Airport Brasschaat at Landings.com

Airports in Antwerp Province
Brasschaat